Charles Robert Kidder (born 1945), was chairman and CEO of 3Stone Advisors LLC, and later chairman of Chrysler Group LLC and has previously served as CEO of Duracell, CEO of Borden, Inc., and serves on the board of Merck and Morgan Stanley.

Career 
At the time of his appointment, Kidder was Chairman and CEO of 3Stone Advisors LLC, an investment firm that focuses on clean-tech companies. He holds an M.S. Industrial Economics from Iowa State University and a B.S. Industrial Engineering from the University of Michigan. Kidder is an alumnus of Lambda Chi Alpha fraternity, having been initiated at its Michigan chapter as an undergraduate.

He resides with his family in Columbus, Ohio.

References

Chrysler executives
Directors of Morgan Stanley
Living people
University of Michigan College of Engineering alumni
1945 births
American chief executives of food industry companies
American chief executives of manufacturing companies
Iowa State University alumni